Mihály Mayer (December 27, 1933 – September 4, 2000) was a Hungarian water polo player who competed in the  1956 Summer Olympics, 1960 Summer Olympics, 1964 Summer Olympics, and in the 1968 Summer Olympics. He is one of eight male athletes who won four or more Olympic medals in water polo.

He was Jewish, was born in Újpest, and died in Budapest.

Mayer was part of the Hungarian team which won the gold medal in the 1956 tournament. He played four matches and scored one goal.

Four years later he was a member of the Hungarian team which won the bronze medal in the 1960 Olympic tournament. He played three matches and scored one goal.

At the 1964 Games he won his second gold medal with the Hungarian team. He played five matches.

In 1968 he won again a bronze medal when the Hungarian team finished third in the Olympic tournament. He played all eight matches.

Coach career
As a coach he led the Hungary men's national water polo team to the silver medal at the Guayaquil Water Polo World Championship in 1982.

See also
 Hungary men's Olympic water polo team records and statistics
 List of multiple Olympic medalists in one event
 List of Olympic champions in men's water polo
 List of Olympic medalists in water polo (men)
 List of players who have appeared in multiple men's Olympic water polo tournaments
 List of members of the International Swimming Hall of Fame
 List of select Jewish water polo players
 Blood in the Water match

References

External links
 

1933 births
2000 deaths
Hungarian male water polo players
Olympic water polo players of Hungary
Water polo players at the 1956 Summer Olympics
Water polo players at the 1960 Summer Olympics
Water polo players at the 1964 Summer Olympics
Water polo players at the 1968 Summer Olympics
Olympic gold medalists for Hungary
Olympic bronze medalists for Hungary
Olympic medalists in water polo
Jewish water polo players
Hungarian Jews
Medalists at the 1968 Summer Olympics
Medalists at the 1964 Summer Olympics
Medalists at the 1960 Summer Olympics
Medalists at the 1956 Summer Olympics
Water polo players from Budapest